The Black Order is a supervillain team appearing in American comic books published by Marvel Comics. They are a group of alien warriors with various supernatural abilities who serve Thanos. The original iteration, introduced in the 2013 Infinity storyline following a cameo appearance in The New Avengers #8 (September 2013), consists of Ebony Maw, Corvus Glaive, Proxima Midnight, Black Dwarf, and Supergiant, with Black Swan later joining the group as well.

The Black Order have been adapted from the comics into several other forms of media, such as animated television series and video games. The group (renamed the "Children of Thanos") made their live-action debut in the Marvel Cinematic Universe film Avengers: Infinity War (2018). Alternate versions of the Children of Thanos later appeared in the film Avengers: Endgame (2019) and the animated Disney+ series What If...? (2021).

Fictional team biography

Thanos' version
The Black Order is a group of ruthless aliens that serve Thanos. They help Thanos raze worlds from which they demand tribute. When Corvus Glaive sent one of their Outriders to find a new world to raze, the Outrider targeted Earth.

The Black Order arrive on Earth in search of the Infinity Gems, which are under the control of the Illuminati. Each member of the Order targets a member of the Illuminati with varying degrees of success. During their search for the gems, Ebony Maw finds Thanos' son, Thane, whom Thanos wishes to kill.

During a battle with the Avengers, Black Dwarf and Supergiant are killed, while Ebony Maw betrays Thanos and frees Thane. Thane traps Thanos, Corvus Glaive, and Proxima Midnight in an amber construct which leaves them in a state of "living death."

While Thanos was imprisoned in the Triskelion, a mysterious cloaked figure offered to help him obtain the Mjolnir of Earth-1610. Thanos accepted the deal. To ensure success, Thanos formed a second incarnation of the Black Order with Proxima Midnight and Black Swan of Earth-1365. He dispatched them to the Collector's ship in order to obtain the Mjolnir of Earth-1610. There, the trio battled Thor and Beta Ray Bill and failed in retrieving the hammer. Upon returning to Thanos, the cloaked figure revealed herself to be the Asgardian Death Goddess Hela who then brutally killed both Black Swan and Proxima Midnight to demonstrate her power. She told Thanos that she needed his help to reclaim her rulership of Hel and offered to grant him the death he has long been seeking in exchange. They then kiss in a passionate embrace.

After Gamora killed Thanos, Hela and the Black Order, using Knowhere as their ship, stole Thanos' body from Starfox, for Hela to resurrect him. After getting the head from Annihilus, the Black Order went to Eros, revealed as the consciousness of Thanos in the body of his brother, planning to return to his own body.

Corvus Glaive's version
After the restructuring of the multiverse, when Thanos was missing, Corvus Glaive gathered the worst criminals in the universe in a second version of the Black Order, as part of his plan to create his own empire. Using a moon called the Black Quadrant that belonged to Thanos, Corvus Glaive and the Black Order began to conquer different planets. When Thanos returned, he broke the blade off of Corvus Glaive's pike. Rather than die at the hands of Thanos, Corvus Glaive took the broken blade and killed himself. Afterwards, Thanos reclaimed the Black Quadrant.

Challenger's version
During the "No Surrender" arc, the Black Order was reorganized with Ebony Maw and Black Swan with Corvus Glaive, Proxima Midnight, and Black Dwarf back from the dead while Supergiant is alive as a psychic projection. Earth was stolen from where it used to be the battleground for the Black Order's fight with an alien version of the Lethal Legion that was formed by Grandmaster. It was revealed that this Black Order was formed by the Challenger who is an old rival of Grandmaster. After the Avengers put an end to the contest, the Black Order regroups on the planet Angargal. They are approached by Grandmaster who had an offer for them.

Members

Thanos' first version
 Black Dwarf - A member of the Black Order who has super-strength, enhanced density, and impenetrable skin. He is the brother of Corvus Glaive. He is killed by Ronan the Accuser but later resurrected by Challenger.
 Corvus Glaive - Thanos' most favored general and husband of Proxima Midnight, who has enhanced strength, speed, durability, and endurance and uses a bladed pike which can cut through anything. When Corvus Glaive has the bladed pike in his hand, it makes him immortal. He commits suicide to avoid being killed by Thanos.
 Ebony Maw - A member of the Black Order who has genius-level intellect, and specializes in persuasion. He utilizes a teleportation device and force field generator.
 Proxima Midnight - A member of the Black Order. She is a master hand-to-hand combatant, has super-strength, and is highly impervious to injury. Her lance transforms into unavoidable toxic light beams. She is killed by Hela.
 Supergiant - A member of the Black Order with telepathic abilities. She is apparently killed by Lockjaw, but later returns as a being of psychic energy.

Corvus Glaive's version
 Corvus Glaive - Leader. Committed suicide.
 Coven - A trio of three unnamed witches. Following Corvus Glaive's death, the Coven remained allied with Thanos.

Thanos' second version
 Thanos
 Proxima Midnight
 Black Swan of Earth-1365

Challenger's version
 Black Dwarf
 Black Swan
 Corvus Glaive
 Ebony Maw
 Proxima Midnight
 Supergiant

In other media

Television
 The Black Order appears in the Avengers Assemble animated series, with Proxima Midnight voiced by Kari Wahlgren, Corvus Glaive voiced by David Kaye, Ebony Maw voiced by René Auberjonois, Supergiant voiced by Hynden Walch, and Black Dwarf having no dialogue.
 The Black Order appears in the Guardians of the Galaxy animated series, with Kari Wahlgren, David Kaye, and Hynden Walch reprising their roles as Proxima Midnight, Corvus Glaive, and Supergiant respectively while Ebony Maw is voiced by James Urbaniak and Black Dwarf is voiced by Jesse Burch. In the episode "Undercover Angle", Supergiant had been previously apprehended by the Nova Corps while the other members seek to obtain Ronan the Accuser's Universal Weapon. When they and the Guardians of the Galaxy find it, Titus attacks both parties, forcing them into a temporary truce to keep Titus from getting it. Titus defeats most of the Black Order and they are arrested by the Nova Corps. In the episodes "Lyin' Eyes" and "Freed Bird", Maw leaves the Black Order after Mantis convinces him to join the Universal Believers and eventually convinces Midnight and Dwarf to do the same.

Marvel Cinematic Universe

The Black Order, barring Supergiant and alternatively referred to as the "Children of Thanos", appear in media set in the Marvel Cinematic Universe, with Ebony Maw voiced and motion-captured by Tom Vaughan-Lawlor; Black Dwarf (renamed Cull Obsidian) voiced and motion-captured by Terry Notary; Proxima Midnight voiced and facial-captured by Carrie Coon, with motion capture primarily provided by stuntwoman Monique Ganderton; and Corvus Glaive voiced and motion-captured by Michael James Shaw. Directors Joe and Anthony Russo took several creative liberties with the group's depiction, altering their abilities and most notably excluding Supergiant for "consolidation".
 In the live-action film Avengers: Infinity War, the Children of Thanos assist Thanos in finding the Infinity Stones and are sent to Earth to retrieve the Time and Mind Stones. Maw and Obsidian attempt to take the Time Stone from Stephen Strange's Eye of Agamotto while Glaive and Midnight attempt to steal the Mind Stone from Vision, but they are each killed by members of the Avengers: Maw by Tony Stark, Obsidian by Bruce Banner, Midnight by Wanda Maximoff, and Glaive by Vision.
 An alternate timeline version of the Children of Thanos appear in the live-action film Avengers: Endgame, with Ganderton fully taking over the role of Midnight. They time-travel to 2023 to help Thanos stop the Avengers from foiling his plans. During the ensuing battle however, Obsidian is crushed to death by Scott Lang / Giant-Man, Glaive is killed by Okoye, and Midnight and Maw are disintegrated when Stark uses the Infinity Stones.
 Several alternate timeline versions of the Children of Thanos appear in the Disney+ animated series What If...?, with Coon and Vaughan-Lawlor reprising their roles while Glaive is voiced by Fred Tatasciore and Obsidian has no dialogue. 
 The first version, known by their original name of the Black Order and with Obsidian under his original name of Black Dwarf, appear in the episode "What If... T'Challa Became a Star-Lord?", set in an alternate timeline where T'Challa / Star-Lord convinced Thanos to abandon his genocidal ways. Because they were never found and adopted by Thanos, the Black Order instead became security operatives for the Collector, who assumed the role of the "most ruthless kingpin in the intergalactic underworld" when Thanos reformed and vacated the position. The Black Order battle Thanos and the Ravagers, during which Glaive is shot by Nebula, Maw is shot by the Collector's slave Carina, Dwarf is killed by Nebula via the Embers of Genesis, and Midnight is caught up in the resultant terraforming of Knowhere.
 Maw and Obsidian appear in the episode "What If... Zombies?!", set in an alternate timeline where a quantum virus transformed Earth's population into zombies. After being sent to Earth to retrieve the Time Stone for Thanos, Maw and Obsidian are attacked by a zombified Tony Stark, Stephen Strange, and Wong, and also become infected. The zombified Maw and Obsidian are subsequently killed by Hope van Dyne and an army of ants.

Video games
The Black Order has been featured in a number of Marvel games:
Marvel: Avengers Alliance
Marvel Strike Force
Marvel: Future Fight
Lego Marvel Super Heroes 2 (as part of the Avengers: Infinity War DLC Pack)
Marvel: Ultimate Alliance 3: The Black Order
Cull Obsidian, Ebony Maw, Proxima Midnight and Corvus Glaive also appeared in Marvel Contest of Champions and Marvel vs Capcom, but were not identified as the Black Order.

Collected editions

References

External links
 Black Order (Thanos' version) at Marvel Wiki
 Black Order (Corvus Glaive's version) at Marvel Wiki
 Black Order at Comic Vine

Marvel Comics extraterrestrial supervillains
Marvel Comics supervillain teams